Bute Street may refer to:

 Bute Street, Cardiff
 Bute Street, Hong Kong